Mark S. Soloway is a leading authority in urologic cancer, researcher, former departmental Chair, medical professor and invitational lecturer. He served as Chairman of the University of Miami Miller School of Medicine Department of Urology and is currently a professor at the Miller School of Medicine. Born in Cleveland, Soloway received his B.Sc. from Northwestern University in Chicago (1961–1964). He completed his M.D. and residency at Case Western Reserve University School of Medicine in Cleveland, Ohio (1964–1970). He completed a fellowship at the National Cancer Institute of the National Institute of Health in Bethesda, MD (1970–1972). Soloway has received numerous awards for his work as a researcher and teacher, These awards are American Urological Association's Gold Cystoscope award, Mosby Scholarship for Scholastic Excellence award (1967), North Central Section of American Urological Association Traveling Fellowship award (1972) and many others. These are outstanding achievements for an individual who has contributed most to the field of urology within ten years of completion of his residency program” (1984).

Honors and awards
Soloway has received numerous honors and awards. These include the Gold Cystoscope Award from the American Urological Association in 1984, and the Presidential Citation of 2008 from the American Urological Association for his contributions to clinical urology and his educational innovations. Soloway was honored with a corresponding membership in the German Urology Association and the Dutch Urologic Society. Soloway has been the Visiting Professor in over 50 academic programs both nationally and internationally and a guest speaker at national meetings in over 30 countries. He was one of the founding members of the International Urologic Research Society. In 2004–2005 Soloway served the Chair of the first International Panel on Cancer, a project that included fourteen individual panels and over one hundred experts in different aspects of bladder cancer. The Societe Internationale de Urologie (the governing body of the International Panel on Bladder Cancer) and the International Consultation of Urologic Diseases have jointly commissioned him again to Chair the second International Panel on Bladder Cancer.

Research

Work at National Cancer Institute 
Soloway's contribution to the field of bladder cancer began when he was a Clinical Associate at the National Cancer Institute of the National Institutes of Health. While working at the NCI, Soloway was instrumental in developing a unique carcinogen-induced animal model for urothelial carcinoma. This FANFT-induced primary and transplantable tumor model allowed him to investigate the efficacy of several investigational chemotherapeutic drugs for the treatment of bladder cancer. Today, even after more than thirty years, this transplantable tumor model, now established as the MBT-2 tumor and its more malignant derivative MBT-9, are still being used by researchers all over the world to test experimental and targeted therapeutic agents. Soloway's research was supported by NIH funding throughout his residency in Urology at Case Western Reserve University and as faculty at the University of Tennessee Center for the Health Sciences.

Orthotopic Development 
At the same time, Soloway was studying the usefulness of different investigational drugs in the animal model, he was also testing the hypothesis that the high rate of local recurrence of urothelial tumors may be the result of implantation of tumor cells on the urothelial surface following endoscopic resection of bladder tumors. By developing an orthotopic bladder implantation animal tumor model, Soloway was able to establish that an injury to the urothelium created the necessary environment for tumor implantation and the scientific evidence in support of early intravesical chemotherapy following transurethral resection of a bladder tumor. Twenty years later, a series of prospective randomized clinical trials have firmly established the benefit of post-TURBT intravesical chemotherapy. It is also noteworthy that the orthotopic tumor model developed by Soloway is still the only tumor model that recapitulates the development of muscle-invasive bladder cancer in patients.

Use of Flexible Cystoscopy 
Soloway was one of the first urologic oncologists to use flexible cystoscopy as an integral part of his office practice; today, the majority of the world uses it.

Transrectal Ultrasonography for Prostate Cancer 
In contrast to Soloway's work in bladder cancer, which was largely initiated by laboratory work using his animal model, his research on prostate cancer is clinically oriented and has focused in six different areas: the use of transrectal ultrasonography for the diagnosis of prostate cancer; the development of the periprostatic nerve block to decrease pain during biopsy; the evaluation of the role of androgen deprivation prior to radical prostatectomy for locally advanced prostate cancer; the importance of quality of life in treatment decision-making; the recognition of active surveillance as a management strategy for low-risk prostate cancer; and surgical techniques for total prostatectomy.

Always fascinated with new technology, very early on Soloway saw the potential of ultrasound guided biopsies over the digitally guided biopsies and soon he began promoting the TRUS biopsy method to urologists for their outpatient clinics. In an effort to minimize the discomfort from biopsies, he also popularized the use of the periprostatic nerve block. This procedure is used to minimize the pain associated with a prostate biopsy and is used in over 500,000 procedures annually in the US alone.

Evaluating Androgen Deprivation 
During the 1980s and early 1990s, a high percentage of patients with prostate cancer were diagnosed with locally advanced disease. Anecdotally, many of these patients were given the newly developed LHRH analogs as initial treatment for their disease. Since their initial responses were impressive, it seemed reasonable to give androgen deprivation prior to prostatectomy with the hope of improving progression free and overall survival. Enlisting the cooperation of a multi-institutional group, Soloway initiated a prospective randomized trial to test the efficacy of neoadjuvant androgen deprivation therapy. This randomized trial showed that although the surgical margin rate was lower for men who had received androgen deprivation prior to prostatectomy, there was no improvement in progression free or overall survival. Other groups who later performed similar studies have substantiated these results.

Positive Surgical Margins 
Another focus of Soloway's clinical research has been on the relationship between positive surgical margins and the preservation of the bladder neck and approach to the seminal vesicles. His first publication in 1996 on this topic detailed pathological analysis of the location and consequences of positive surgical margins. In a more recent paper published in the Journal of Urology, he reported that the recurrence rate was only 20% in his patient cohort with a positive surgical margin and therefore, the routine adjuvant radiation therapy would over treat 80% of the patients. On the subject of urinary continence, for over 20 years, Soloway has been a proponent of bladder neck preservation for enhancing urinary continence without compromising cancer control for patients undergoing radical prostatectomy. Soloway and M. Manoharan have worked together to minimize the side effects of a radical prostatectomy. They have popularized the lower abdominal transverse incision to minimize pain and enhance recovery as well as providing a smaller, less obvious scar. They have shown that most patients do not require a drain and an inguinal hernia can be easily be repaired at the same operation of a radical prostatectomy using this transverse incision.

Watchful Waiting Approach 
With the advent of PSA and early detection of prostate cancer, Soloway, concerned about the risk of overtreatment, has been an advocate of active surveillance for patients with low-risk, low volume Gleason 6 prostate cancer who are compliant with careful monitoring. In 2000 he published his first series of patients including those eligible for watchful waiting, as well as active surveillance and reported that only a few of these patients went on to have treatment. Using a tighter definition for active surveillance, Soloway's group reported that less than 15% of these prostate cancer patients went on to treatment. This series was updated recently in European Urology with the addition of quality of life parameters and a constant of 15% progressing to treatment.

Work on Renal Tumors 
Over the last two decades, Soloway has worked closely in tandem with a former resident and co-faculty member, Gaetano Ciancio on kidney cancer. Together they have revolutionized the surgical approach for large renal tumors, particularly those in which the tumor extends into the vena cava. Ciancio is a urologist, who is fellowship trained in renal and liver transplantation. More than 10 years ago, Soloway and Ciancio worked as a team to reduce the perioperative morbidity and mortality associated with these large tumor masses. Their idea was to incorporate surgical techniques from liver transplantation to increase the exposure of the vena cava with the anticipation that this would reduce blood loss and obviate circulatory arrest. Together they have published over 35 articles beginning with their first description of this technique in 2000. Their most recent publication is an update of their step-by-step approach toward minimizing complications related to renal cell carcinoma with vena cava thrombus. This series emphasizes the improvements in safety and reduction in operative mortality and morbidity related to their technique. Since most tertiary medical centers where these procedures are likely to be performed now have liver transplant surgeons, this technique can easily be duplicated.

Cancer Support Group 
Despite his busy clinical practice and research programs in the mid-1980s, Soloway recognized the need to address quality of life issues associated with the treatments for prostate cancer. He developed one of the first prostate cancer support groups in the country in Memphis, Tennessee. In 1992, he co-authored one of the first QOL studies examining patient preference related to LHRH versus orchiectomy for patients with advanced disease. In 1995 Soloway and his colleagues reported on a study that looked at patients with localized prostate cancer and the QOL implications of surgical management vs. radiation therapy. Recognizing that prostate cancer is a couple's disease, Soloway also studied the psychosocial and sexual implications of this disease on patients and their partners.

References 

1943 births
American medical academics
American urologists
Physicians from Cleveland
Living people